KSKS (93.7 MHz) is a commercial FM radio station in Fresno, California.   The station is owned by Cumulus Media and it airs a country music radio format branded as "Kiss Country".  Its studios are at the Radio City building on Shaw Avenue in North Fresno and its transmitter is off Auberry Road in Meadow Lakes, California. KSKS has local DJs during the day, and in the evening, airs the syndicated Nash Nights with Shawn Parr from Nash FM, a subsidiary of Cumulus Media.

KSKS is licensed to broadcast in the HD (digital hybrid) format. As one of the oldest FM stations in the Fresno media market, the station is considered a grandfathered superpower station, as its effective radiated power is 68,000 watts at a height above average terrain of 580 meters (1,903 feet).  (Stations at that height in Central California should run less than 3,000 watts, according to current Federal Communications Commission rules for Class B regions; however, KSKS went on the air in 1946, founded before the rules were put in place.)

History
KRFM were the original call letters when the station first signed on in 1946.  The first owner was Paul Bartlett, a Fresno radio station pioneer.  The station's studios were originally at the transmitter site in Meadow Lakes.

The station was acquired by the owner of KFRE (940 AM, now KYNO) and KFRE-TV (now KFSN-TV), which originally operated on VHF channel 12, later UHF channel 30.  The station took the call sign KFRE-FM.  All three co-owned stations were sold by Triangle Publications in 1971.  Because the stations were sold to separate companies, and the owners of the AM station kept the KFRE call sign, the FM station took new call letters, KFYE, as a mostly-instrumental beautiful music outlet.

Through the 1980s, the station added more vocals as an easy listening station.  In 1992, KFYE completed the transition to an adult contemporary format known as "Y-94." In the 1980s, Ray Appleton hosted "Lunchtime at the Oldies" on Y-94. Ray would go on to become a popular talk show host at KMJ.

On November 16, 2006, CBS Radio announced the sale of KSKS and its other Fresno-area stations to Peak Broadcasting.

On August 30, 2013, a deal was announced in which Townsquare Media would purchase Peak Broadcasting, and then immediately swap Peak's Fresno stations, including KSKS, to Cumulus Media in exchange for Cumulus' stations in Dubuque, Iowa and Poughkeepsie, New York. The deal was part of Cumulus' acquisition of Dial Global.  Peak, Townsquare, and Dial Global were all controlled by Oaktree Capital Management. The sale to Cumulus was completed on November 14, 2013.

References

External links
Official Website

List of "grandfathered" FM radio stations in the U.S.

SKS
Cumulus Media radio stations